Harry S. Truman High School is a high school located in Federal Way, Washington, United States. It is part of the Federal Way Public Schools District.

Truman features
 Modified school calendar
 Ability to take online courses through the Internet Academy
 Family involvement
 Individual learning plan
 Authentic project assessments
 Rigorous academic standards
 College prep and planning
 Building and celebrating a diverse community
 Respect for multiculturalism
 Parent involvement in student work
 Support for parents
 Level 1 (freshman and sophomores) & Level 2 (juniors and seniors)

Truman High School has three academies:
 Career Academy
 International Academy
 The Internet Academy – operating since 1996, the oldest online school in Washington State

Facilities
The 23,300 SF building was designed for two semi-independent schools that accommodate 100 students each within an adaptable shell. Large multi-purpose areas for social interaction reinforce a sense of school community . Individual student workstations facilitate personalized activities and project-based learning. The school was designed to serve at-risk students, often one step from dropping out of school, through supporting small learning communities which reinforce personal connections within an open environment. Photos of the facility can be viewed at the architect's website.

The design was recognized as a finalist for the 2003 CEFPI James D. MacConnell Award for Excellence in School Design.

The school shares a campus with the Federal Way Head Start facility, the Truman Garden, and the EX3 Ron Sandwith Teen Center (Boys and Girls Clubs of King County)

References

External links
Federal Way Public Schools profile
School site
Internet Academy webpage
Internet Academy – OSPI School Report Card 2011–12
Greatschools.org
CEFPI
School District Head Start
EX3 Jim Sandwith Teen Center website

High schools in King County, Washington
Federal Way, Washington
Public high schools in Washington (state)
Educational institutions established in 1996
1996 establishments in Washington (state)